Fred S. Chicken (1888-1968) was a professional football player who spent one season in the early National Football League, then called the American Professional Football Association, with the Rock Island Independents. However, he also played for the Minneapolis Marines (1915-1918), prior to that team's entry into the NFL. He was the star halfback of the 1907 undefeated and unscored upon Minneapolis North High School National Football Champions of the US. They had defeated the Oak Park, Illinois football team, another undefeated and unscored upon team, to claim that title.

References

External links
Fred Chicken bio

1888 births
Players of American football from Minnesota
Minneapolis Marines players
Rock Island Independents players
1968 deaths
American football running backs